Dalian Shide was a professional Chinese football club based in Dalian, Liaoning province, China who played in China's football league system between 1955 and 2012. Their home stadiums were the 55,843 capacity Dalian People's Stadium and then later in 1997 they moved to the 30,776 capacity Jinzhou Stadium.

The club was initially founded in 1955 as Dalian Shipyards and made sporadic appearances within the Chinese national leagues until 1982 when the local Dalian government took ownership of the club and renamed it Dalian Football Club. The club won their first major silverware when they won the 1992 domestic cup title. In 1993, the club was reorganised to become a completely professional football team, renamed themselves Dalian Wanda FC and went on to win the first fully professional 1994 Chinese Jia-A League title. The tycoon Xu Ming and the Shide Group would go on to take over the club rename it Dalian Shide.

Achieving a total of eight league titles from both the Jia A and the rebranded CSL Dalian were the most successful club in Chinese football, while in the Asian Football Confederation the club reached the 1997–98 Asian Club Championship and 2000–01 Asian Cup Winners' Cup finals.

History
The club was founded as Dalian Shipyards in 1955.  After the 1982 season the local Dalian government took over its ownership and renamed it Dalian Football Club to represent the city.  The club immediately became a major force within the second tier and eventually win promotion to the top level in 1984 when they won the division title. For the next several seasons Dalian were predominantly top tier regulars except for one season in 1989 when they were in the second tier, however they quickly won promotion and soon went on to win their first domestic cup in 1992.

Soon afterwards the Chinese Football Association started to demand full professionalism and sponsorship from all the clubs in China. Dalian went on to be one of the first fully professionalised clubs in China on July 3, 1992. They gained sponsorship in 1993 from the China Hualu group and then the Dalian Wanda Group on March 8, 1994 who changed the club's name to Dalian Wanda FC.

In the inaugural fully professional 1994 league season, the club brought in former Chinese national team manager Zhang Honggen to coach the team and under his leadership guide the club to their first ever league title. The following season saw Zhang Honggen decide to not stay on as the club's manager and Dalian were unable to retain the league title, however the club eventually brought in former Chinese international player Chi Shangbin into the club as their new manager. With Wang Jianlin and the full support of his company the Dalian Wanda Group taking full ownership of the club, they started to build a football dynasty by winning the 1996 league season undefeated. Domestic dominance continued in the 1997 league season while Dalian narrowly just missed out on 1997–98 Asian Club Championship and Chi Shangbin decided to leave to take on a position with the Chinese national team. Despite this Dalian had a well-funded and prolific academy that produced numerous Chinese internationals such as Zhang Enhua, Li Ming and Sun Jihai and with another former Chinese national team manager Xu Genbao Dalian were easily able to replicate their success by winning the 1998 league title.

In 2000 at the height of their success, Wang Jianlin decided to pull out from football after publicly criticizing Chinese referees for match fixing and he did not return to football until 2011 when his associated Wanda Group sponsored the 2011 Chinese Super League after former Chinese FA Vice-Chairmen Xie Yalong and Nan Yong stood on trial for bribery.

On January 9, 2000 Wang Jianlin sold Dalian to Xu Ming and the Shide Group for 120 million Yuan and the club's name was changed to Dalian Shide. The new owners brought in Serbian Milorad Kosanović as their new manager and win another league title in the 2000 league season. Kosanović made the men's team by far the most successful team in Chinese football by winning the 2001, 2002 league title, 2001 Chinese FA Cup and just missing out on 2000–01 Asian Cup Winners' Cup during his reign. When Milorad Kosanović left to coach the Serbia and Montenegro national under-21 football team the club eventually brought in Vladimir Petrović who guided the team to the recently rebranded 2005 Chinese Super League title as well as 2005 Chinese FA Cup. With the retirement of striker Hao Haidong and Vladimir Petrović leaving to take the Chinese national team management position, the club went through an inconsistent period due to team and coach changes. In 2008, Dalian Shide selected a number of players from its academy to play in a satellite team in the S.League in Singapore, called Dalian Shide Siwu FC.

On 14 February 2010, Zhang Yalin died of lymphoma in Dalian, Liaoning, aged 28, after a two-year-battle with the disease.

On 30 November 2012, Dalian Shide were acquired by Aerbin Group and merged into Dalian Aerbin F.C., although a lot of confusion and rumour surrounded the demise of Shide.

Club name history
 1955–1982: Dalian Shipyards
 1983–1992: Dalian Football Club
 1993: Dalian Hualu
 1994–1998: Dalian Wanda
 1999: Dalian Wanda Shide
 2000–2012: Dalian Shide

Grounds
Dalian played in the  seat multi-purpose Dalian People's Stadium for much of their early history. In 1997 the club moved to the recently built  seat multi-use Jinzhou Stadium in Dalian, China.

Last Squad

Retired numbers

26 –  Zhang Yalin, Midfielder, 2000–2009 posthumous. The number was retired in March 2010.

Last coaching staff

Managerial history
Managers who have coached the club and team since the team became a professional club back on July 3, 1992

Honours
All-time honours list including amateur period.

League
 Chinese Jia-A League / Chinese Super League
 Winners (8): 1994, 1996, 1997, 1998, 2000, 2001, 2002, 2005
 Chinese Jia-B League
 Winners (2): 1983, 1984
 Chinese Yi League/China League Two (Third Tier League)
 Winners (1): 1981

Cup
 Chinese FA Cup
 Winners (3): 1992, 2001, 2005
 Chinese Super Cup
 Winners (3): 1997, 2001, 2003

Continental
 Asian Club Championship
 Runners-up (1): 1997–98
 Asian Cup Winners' Cup
 Runners-up (1): 2001

Youth
 U19
 U19 Winners Cup Winners: 2006
 U17
 U17 Youth League Champions: 2000

Results
All-time League Rankings

As of end of 2012 league season.

: No promotion. : In final group stage. : Deduct 6 points for abandoning a match in protest of a referee's call.

Key
 Pld = Played
 W = Games won
 D = Games drawn
 L = Games lost
 F = Goals for
 A = Goals against
 Pts = Points
 Pos = Final position

 DNQ = Did not qualify
 DNE = Did not enter
 NH = Not Held
- = Does Not Exist
 R1 = Round 1
 R2 = Round 2
 R3 = Round 3
 R4 = Round 4

 F = Final
 SF = Semi-finals
 QF = Quarter-finals
 R16 = Round of 16
 Group = Group stage
 GS2 = Second Group stage
 QR1 = First Qualifying Round
 QR2 = Second Qualifying Round
 QR3 = Third Qualifying Round

See also
Dalian Shide FC (Singapore)

References

External links

Sinosoc.com

 
Football clubs in China
Association football clubs established in 1982
Association football clubs disestablished in 2012
Sport in Dalian
1982 establishments in China
2012 disestablishments in China
Defunct football clubs in China
Football clubs in Liaoning
Works association football clubs in China